Pieter ("Piet") Lodewijk Ooms (11 December 1884, Amsterdam – 14 February 1961, Amsterdam) was a Dutch freestyle swimmer and water polo player who competed in the 1908 Summer Olympics.

He participated in the 1500 metre freestyle competition, but was eliminated in the first round.

Also he was part of the Dutch water polo team, which finished fourth in the 1908 tournament.

References

External links
Piet Ooms at Sports-reference.com

1884 births
1961 deaths
Dutch male freestyle swimmers
Dutch male water polo players
Olympic swimmers of the Netherlands
Olympic water polo players of the Netherlands
Swimmers at the 1908 Summer Olympics
Water polo players at the 1908 Summer Olympics
Swimmers from Amsterdam
20th-century Dutch people